In graph theory, a biconnected component (sometimes known as a 2-connected component) is a maximal biconnected subgraph.  Any connected graph decomposes into a tree of biconnected components called the block-cut tree of the graph. The blocks are attached to each other at shared vertices called cut vertices or separating vertices or articulation points.  Specifically, a cut vertex is any vertex whose removal increases the number of connected components.

Algorithms

Linear time depth-first search
The classic sequential algorithm for computing biconnected components in a connected undirected graph is due to John Hopcroft and Robert Tarjan (1973). It runs in linear time, and is based on depth-first search. This algorithm is also outlined as Problem 22-2 of Introduction to Algorithms (both 2nd and 3rd editions).

The idea is to run a depth-first search while maintaining the following information:
 the depth of each vertex in the depth-first-search tree (once it gets visited), and
The depth is standard to maintain during a depth-first search.

The key fact is that a nonroot vertex  is a cut vertex (or articulation point) separating two biconnected components if and only if there is a child  of  such that .

The root vertex must be handled separately: it is a cut vertex if and only if it has at least two children in the DFS tree.  Thus, it suffices to simply build one component out of each child subtree of the root (including the root).

Pseudocode

 GetArticulationPoints(i, d)
     visited[i] := true
     depth[i] := d
     low[i] := d
     childCount := 0
     isArticulation := false
 
     for each ni in adj[i] do
         if not visited[ni] then
             parent[ni] := i
             GetArticulationPoints(ni, d + 1)
             childCount := childCount + 1
             if low[ni] ≥ depth[i] then
                 isArticulation := true
             low[i] := Min (low[i], low[ni])
         else if ni ≠ parent[i] then
             low[i] := Min (low[i], depth[ni])
     if (parent[i] ≠ null and isArticulation) or (parent[i] = null and childCount > 1) then
         Output i as articulation point

Note that the terms child and parent denote the relations in the DFS tree, not the original graph.

Other algorithms
A simple alternative to the above algorithm uses chain decompositions, which are special ear decompositions depending on DFS-trees. Chain decompositions can be computed in linear time by this traversing rule.

In the online version of the problem, vertices and edges are added (but not removed) dynamically, and a data structure must maintain the biconnected components.  Jeffery Westbrook and Robert Tarjan (1992)  developed an efficient data structure for this problem based on disjoint-set data structures.  Specifically, it processes  vertex additions and  edge additions in  total time, where  is the inverse Ackermann function.  This time bound is proved to be optimal.

Uzi Vishkin and Robert Tarjan (1985)  designed a parallel algorithm on CRCW PRAM that runs in  time with  processors.

Related structures

Equivalence relation
Therefore, this is an equivalence relation, and it can be used to partition the edges into equivalence classes, subsets of edges with the property that two edges are related to each other if and only if they belong to the same equivalence class. The subgraphs formed by the edges in each equivalence class are the biconnected components of the given graph. Thus, the biconnected components partition the edges of the graph; however, they may share vertices with each other.

Block graph
The block graph of a given graph  is the intersection graph of its blocks.
The graphs  with this property are known as the block graphs.

Block-cut tree
A cutpoint, cut vertex, or articulation point of a graph  is a vertex that is shared by two or more blocks. The structure of the blocks and cutpoints of a connected graph can be described by a tree called the block-cut tree or BC-tree. This tree has a vertex for each block and for each articulation point of the given graph. There is an edge in the block-cut tree for each pair of a block and an articulation point that belongs to that block.

See also
 Triconnected component
 Bridge (graph theory)
 Single-entry single-exit Counter part of biconnected components in directed graphs

Notes

References

External links 
 C++ implementation of Biconnected Components

Graph connectivity
Articles with example pseudocode